The Haitian passport is issued to citizens of Haiti for international travel.

To obtain a Haitian passport, one must be a Haitian citizen and furnish proof thereof. As of 2013, people who were born in Haiti but who later changed their nationality may obtain Haitian passports.

Physical appearance
The front cover is dark blue in colour and bears the Coat of arms of Haiti embossed in silver. and 'Republic of Haiti Passport' in French and Haitian Creole, the two official languages of the Haiti.

Identification page 

 Photo of the passport holder
 Type ("P" for passport)
 Country code
 Passport serial number
 Last name and First name of the passport holder
 Citizenship
 Date of birth (DD. MM. YYYY)
 Gender (M for men or F for women)
 Birth place
 Date of issue (DD. MM. YYYY)
 Passport holder's signature
 Expiration date (DD. MM. YYYY)

The passport is written in Creole and French.

History 
Between 1937 and 1942, a Haitian passport and Haitian citizenship could be obtained without visiting the country.  About 100 Eastern European Jews used this method to escape Europe. At about this time, United States officials became aware of a 'passports for sale' racket carried out with the complicity of the Haitian government. In return for a substantial loan from a Swiss bank, 100  genuine signed passports were made available for sale in Germany, reportedly for $3,000 each.

In 2011, the launch of biometric or epassports was announced.

Visa requirements
As of 1 January 2017, Haitian citizens had visa-free or visa on arrival access to 50 countries and territories, ranking the Haitian passport 86th in terms of travel freedom (tied with Gabonese and Malagasy passports) according to the Henley visa restrictions index.

See also 
 Visa requirements for Haitian citizens

References 

Passports by country
Government of Haiti